Interstate 55 (I-55) is a major Interstate Highway in the central United States. As with most primary Interstates that end in a five, it is a major cross-country, north–south route, connecting the Gulf of Mexico to the Great Lakes. The highway travels from LaPlace, Louisiana, at I-10 to Chicago, Illinois, at U.S. Route 41 (US 41, Lake Shore Drive), at McCormick Place. The major cities that I-55 connects to are (from south to north) New Orleans, Louisiana; Jackson, Mississippi; Memphis, Tennessee; St. Louis, Missouri; and Chicago, Illinois.

The section of I-55 between Chicago and St. Louis was built as an alternate route for U.S. Route 66 (US 66). The Interstate crosses the Mississippi River twice: once at Memphis and again at St. Louis.

History

When it was realized that a national highway system was needed, the Federal Aid Highway Act of 1956 provided for a highway replacing the old US 66 which I-55 filled. I-55 was originally constructed in the 1960s, to extend a section of US 66 between I-294 and Gardner which had been converted into a freeway and had Interstate signage installed in 1960. During the rest of the 1960s, I-55 was built in portions throughout Illinois, eventually connecting St. Louis to Chicago, where it became the fourth direct route between them. As it goes southward, most of the Interstate was purpose-built during the 1960s and 1970s. The entire length was completed in 1979.

Route description

|-
|LA
|65.81
|105.91
|-
|MS
|290.41
|467.37
|-
|TN
|12.28
|19.76
|-
|AR
|72.22
|116.22
|-
|MO
|210.45
|338.69
|-
|IL
|293.80
|472.72
|-
|Total
|964.25
|1,551.81
|}

Louisiana

Approximately a third of the distance consists of the Manchac Swamp Bridge, a nearly  causeway, often cited as the third-longest viaduct in the world.

Mississippi

In Mississippi, I-55 runs  from the Louisiana border near Osyka to Southaven on the Tennessee border, just south of Memphis, Tennessee. Noteworthy cities and towns that I-55 passes through or close by to are Brookhaven, McComb, Jackson, and Grenada. This highway parallels US 51 in its path roughly through the center of Mississippi. The  from Hernando to the Tennessee state line coincide with the newer I-69.

The Mississippi section of I-55 is defined in the Mississippi Code § 65-3-3.

Tennessee

I-55 in Tennessee lies entirely within the city of Memphis, passing through the southern and western parts of the city and providing a bypass of downtown for motorists who do not want to take I-240 and I-40 through downtown to cross the Mississippi River. The western portion of this highway, which passes through an industrialized section of the city, contains numerous low-clearance bridges and also a very tight 270-degree cloverleaf turn northbound at Crump Boulevard. The Tennessee Department of Transportation (TDOT) currently has an interchange improvement project for this portion. Heavy truck traffic heading to and from Arkansas in this area is hence directed to detour via I-240 and I-40.

Arkansas

I-55 enters Arkansas from Tennessee as it crosses the Mississippi River on the Memphis & Arkansas Bridge. After separating from I-40, I-55 turns northward and runs with US 61, US 63, and US 64 until US 64 exits in through Marion. I-55/US 61/US 63 continues north through Crittenden County through rural farms of the Arkansas delta, including an interchange with I-555/US 63 in Turrell. I-55 passes through Blytheville, where it has a junction with Highway 18 (AR 18) before entering Missouri. I-55 parallels US 61 in its path through Arkansas, which it continues to do after crossing into Missouri.

Missouri

In Missouri, I-55 runs from the southeastern part of the state, at the Arkansas border, to St. Louis. In this city, I-44 merges in with I-55, and then I-64 (on the Poplar Street Bridge), when crossing the Mississippi River into Illinois.

Among the cities and towns served by I-55 in Missouri are Sikeston, Cape Girardeau, and St. Louis.

As noted above, I-55 parallels US 61 for most of its course through Missouri, from the Arkansas border to the southern portion of St. Louis County.

Illinois

Through Illinois, I-55 largely follows the 1940 alignment of the former US 66, now Historic US 66 (Illinois Route 66 Scenic Byway). It runs from the Poplar Street Bridge in East St. Louis to US 41 in Chicago, passing around the state capital of Springfield and the metro area of Bloomington–Normal.

Within Illinois, I-55 goes by several names. Near the I-270/I-70 split, it is referred to as the Paul Simon Freeway after former US Senator Paul Simon, who began his political career in this region. Further north, between the St. Louis area and Springfield, I-55 is named the Vince Demuzio Expressway for former Illinois State Senator Vince Demuzio. Finally, in the Chicago area between the I-80 interchange near Joliet and I-55's eastern terminus at US 41 (Lake Shore Drive) in Chicago, the expressway is referred to as the Adlai E. Stevenson Expressway (previously called the Southwest Expressway) in honor of former Illinois governor Adlai E. Stevenson II, who was a two-time Democratic nominee for President of the United States and also the US Ambassador to the United Nations under Presidents John F. Kennedy and Lyndon B. Johnson. In July 2018 the stretch of I-55 from I-294 to milemarker 202 near Pontiac was renamed as Barack Obama Presidential Expressway.

When the stretch of I-55 through Illinois was being planned during the 1960s, the state's governor, Otto Kerner Jr., made an effort to have it routed close to the larger city of Peoria instead of the straighter route through the Bloomington–Normal area. This ultimately failed plan was ridiculed in the press as the so-called "Kerner Curve". The need for a freeway connection between Springfield and Peoria was later filled by the spur route I-155. This also connects with nearby Lincoln and Morton and forms a triangle between the three population centers in Central Illinois.

Junction list
Louisiana
  in LaPlace
  northeast of LaPlace. The highways travel concurrently to Hammond.
  in Hammond
  in Hammond
Mississippi
  in McComb. The highways travel concurrently to Summit.
  south-southwest of Brookhaven
  in Crystal Springs. The highways travel concurrently to Jackson.
  in Jackson. I-20/I-55/US 49 travel concurrently to Richland.
  in Ridgeland
  in Winona
  in Batesville
  in Hernando. The highways travel concurrently to Memphis, Tennessee.
Tennessee
  in Memphis
  in Memphis
  in Memphis
  in Memphis. I-55/US 61 travels concurrently to Turrell, Arkansas. I-55/US 64 travels concurrently to Marion, Arkansas. I-55/US 70/US 79 travels concurrently to West Memphis, Arkansas.
Arkansas
  in West Memphis. The highways travel concurrently through West Memphis.
  in West Memphis. I-55/US 63 travels concurrently to Turrell.
  in Turrell, Arkansas.
  in Blytheville
Missouri
  east of Steele. The highways travel concurrently to Portageville.
  in Hayti
  in New Madrid
  north of New Madrid
  on the Sikeston–Miner city line
  in Miner
  in Scott City. The highways travel concurrently to Cape Cirardeau.
  in Cape Girardeau
  north-northeast of Jackson
  south-southeast of Festus
  in Festus
  on the Concord–Mehlville CDP line
  on the Concord–Green Park–Mehlville line
  on the McKinley Heights–Soulard, St. Louis neighborhood line. The highways travel concurrently to Downtown St. Louis.
  in Downtown, St. Louis. I-55/I-64 travels concurrently to East St. Louis, Illinois. I-55/US 40 travels concurrently to Troy, Illinois.
Illinois
  in East St. Louis. I-55/I-70 travels concurrently to northwest of Troy.
  in Collinsville
  northwest of Troy
  in Springfield. The highways travel concurrently through Springfield.
  northwest of Lincoln
  southeast of McLean
  in Bloomington. I-55/I-74 travels concurrently to northwest of Normal. I-55/US 51 travels concurrently to Normal.
  in Bloomington
  in Normal
  in Chenoa
  in Channahon
  in Channahon
  in Shorewood
  in Joliet
  on the Bolingbrook–Woodridge city line
  on the Burr Ridge–Indian Head Park–Countryside line
  on the Countryside–Hodgkins city line
  in Armour Square, Chicago
  in Near South Side, Chicago

Auxiliary routes
Spur to Jonesboro, Arkansas: I-555
Caruthersville, Missouri to Dyersburg, Tennessee: I-155
St. Louis, Missouri, area: I-255
Spur to Peoria, Illinois: I-155
In the southwestern suburbs of Chicago, Illinois: I-355

References

External links

 
 Illinois Highway Ends: Interstate 55

 
55